Walter Bini (born 31 May 1930 in Sao Paulo) was a Brazilian clergyman and bishop for the Roman Catholic Diocese of Lins. He was ordained in 1959. He was appointed in 1984. He retired in 1987.

References 

Brazilian Roman Catholic bishops
1930 births
1987 deaths